The High Court of American Samoa is a Samoan court and the highest court below the United States Supreme Court in American Samoa. The Court is located in the capital of Fagatogo. It consists of one chief justice and one associate justice, appointed by the United States Secretary of the Interior, holding office during "good behavior" and removable for cause. As American Samoa has no local federal district court or territorial court, the High Court has also been granted the powers of a federal district court in certain matters while other federal matters are handled by the United States District Court for the District of Columbia and the United States District Court for the District of Hawaii.

The High Court of American Samoa also has several Samoan associate judges who sit with the two justices. Normally, two associate judges will sit with the chief justice and associate justice on every case.

The Secretary of the Interior retains ultimate authority over the courts.

The colonial-style Maugaolii High Court served as the U.S. Navy headquarters during World War II.

Organization
The High Court consists of four divisions:
 the trial division;
 the probate division;
 the land and titles division; and
 the appellate division.

The trial division, which consists of the Chief Justice, the Associate Justice, and associate judges, is a court of general jurisdiction, empowered to hear, among other things, felony cases and civil cases in which the amount in controversy exceeds $5,000.

Justices

The past and present justices of the court:

See also
 Judiciary of American Samoa
 Article I and Article III tribunals#Article IV tribunals

References

External links
American Samoa Legal Database
 

Politics of American Samoa
1921 establishments in the United States
Courts and tribunals established in 1921

 
American Samoa